Lenore Pipes (born 1 November 1985) is a Guamanian former road cyclist. She participated at the 2012 UCI Road World Championships.

Personal life
Pipes completed her undergraduate degree in Biology and Anthropology from Swarthmore College. She then went on to pursue a PhD in Computational Biology from Cornell University, and is a postdoctoral research fellow at University of California, Berkeley.

Major results
Sources:

2012
 9th Liberty Classic
2013
 6th Grand Prix cycliste de Gatineau
2014
 7th Overall Armed Forces Association Cycling Classic
 10th Mildred Kugler Women's Open
 10th Winston-Salem Criterium
2015
 1st Tour of the Battenkill
 3rd Road race, National Collegiate Road Championships
 5th Mildred Kugler Women's Open
 6th Overall Armed Forces Association Cycling Classic
 7th White Spot / Delta Road Race
 8th Grand Prix cycliste de Gatineau

References

External links

1985 births
Guamanian women
Guamanian female cyclists
Living people
People from Hagåtña, Guam
21st-century American women
Swarthmore College alumni
Weill Cornell Medical College alumni
University of California, Berkeley fellows